The Boukman Buhara Mosque is a mosque in Nord-Est Department, Haiti.

History
The construction of the mosque started in 2014 and completed in 2016.

Architecture
The mosque is the first one in the country built with minaret. It has a total floor area of 160 m2.

See also
 Islam in Haiti

References

2016 establishments in Haiti
Mosques completed in 2016
Mosques in Haiti
Nord-Est (department)